Boskednan stone circle is a partially restored prehistoric stone circle near Boskednan, around 4 miles (6 kilometres) northwest of the town of Penzance in  Cornwall, United Kingdom. The megalithic monument is traditionally known as the Nine Maidens or Nine Stones of Boskednan, although the original structure may have contained as many as 22 upright stones around its 69-metre perimeter.

Location
The stone circle is in southwest Cornwall north of the road from Madron to Morvah, and is approximately 1 km northwest of the village of Boskednan and can only be reached on foot. The enigmatic Mên-an-Tol stones (which may also be the remains of a stone circle) are less than 1 kilometre to the southwest.

Construction
The stone circle once probably consisted of 22 granite blocks, from which 10 still survive. Six stones stand upright, one sits half a metre out of the ground, the others remain lying in the soil. The stones are all about 1 m high, the highest measure approximately 2 m and stand to northern edge of the circle. The stone circle originally described a circle with a diameter of approximately 22 m. The stone circle may have belonged with the nearby barrow to an extensive cult district.

History

Stone circles such as that at Boskednan, were erected in the late Neolithic or in the early Bronze Age by representatives of a Megalithic culture. The first mention of the stone circle in modern times, in 1754, is found in the work Antiquities, historical and monumental, of the County of Cornwall by William Borlase, who reported 19 upright standing stones. William Copeland Borlase, a descendant of the earlier Borlase, conducted excavations and found a cist and a funerary urn near the stone circle, dating from the early Bronze Age. Borlase described his discoveries in 1872 in his work Naenia Cornubiae, which concerns prehistoric monuments of Cornwall.

See also

Other prehistoric stone circles in the Penwith region
 Boscawen-Un
 The Merry Maidens - also known as Dans Maen
 Tregeseal East - also known as the Tregeseal Dancing Stones

References

Further reading
 John Barnatt: Prehistoric Cornwall. The Ceremonial Monuments. Turnstone Press Limited, Wellingborough 1982, .
 Robin Payne: The Romance of the Stones. Alexander Associates, Fowey 1999, .

External links

 Boskednan stone circle site page on  The Megalithic Portal
 Nine Stones of Boskednan site page on The Modern Antiquarian
 Boskednan Stone Circle page at Megalithic Walks

Penwith
Stone circles in Cornwall
Bronze Age sites in Cornwall
Prehistoric sites in Cornwall
Stone Age sites in Cornwall